Philip Wilkinson (born 10 August 1947) is an Australian rower. He competed in the men's coxed four event at the 1972 Summer Olympics.

References

1947 births
Living people
Australian male rowers
Olympic rowers of Australia
Rowers at the 1972 Summer Olympics
Place of birth missing (living people)
20th-century Australian people